The Nicobar scops owl (Otus alius) is a species of owl in the family Strigidae.
It is endemic to the Nicobar Islands, India, in particular Great Nicobar Island, but it may also occur on Little Nicobar island.

Its natural habitat is tropical moist lowland forests. It has an uncertain status but is thought to be rare or endangered. It was originally discovered by Pamela C. Rasmussen in 1998. Very little is known about this species, but individuals have been reported to consume spiders, beetles, and geckos.

References

External links 
Owlpages entry

Nicobar scops owl
Birds of the Nicobar Islands
Endemic fauna of the Nicobar Islands
Nicobar scope owl